Ban Chao (32–102 CE), courtesy name Zhongsheng, was a Chinese diplomat, explorer, and military general of the Eastern Han Dynasty. He was born in Fufeng, now Xianyang, Shaanxi. Three of his family members—father Ban Biao, elder brother Ban Gu, younger sister Ban Zhao—were well known historians who wrote the historical text Book of Han, which recorded the history of the Western Han Dynasty. As a Han general and cavalry commander, Ban Chao was in charge of administrating the "Western Regions" (Central Asia) while he was in service. He also led Han forces for over 30 years in the war against the Xiongnu and re-established Han control over the Tarim Basin region. He was made Protector General of the Western Regions by the Han government for his efforts in protecting and governing the regions. Ban Chao is depicted in the Wu Shuang Pu (無雙譜, Table of Peerless Heroes) by Jin Guliang.

As a well-known historian, Ban Chao's family was poor and he worked as a copy-clerk for the government. Emperor Ming himself thought highly of him, and appointed him to be a clerk in the orchid terrace, but Ban Chao was too ambitious to be satisfied with a position like that, and was dismissed later. He was said to be a strong willed young adult with complete disregard for formal conduct. After his brother Ban Gu was removed from his post for his works on the Former Han, Ban Chao argued his case. When his brother was appointed to the imperial library, Ban Chao and his mother moved to the imperial capital Luoyang to accompany him. In 73 however, General Dou Gu embarked on an expedition to attack the Xiongnu, and Ban Chao was appointed as an assistant major. He distinguished himself in command against a Xiongnu detachment, and was appointed by Dou Gu to accompany Officer Guo Xun on a preliminary embassy to the remote western regions. When the group arrived at the capital of Shanshan, King Guang also received an embassy from the Northern Xiongnu. Ban Chao and the small group of delegates slaughtered the Xiongnu envoys and sent their heads to the king. Shocked and overwhelmed by Han brutality, King Guang sent hostages to Han as a pact of non-aggression. This was just the start of the many exploits Ban Chao accomplished in the western regions.

Control of the Tarim Basin

Ban Chao, like his predecessors Huo Qubing and Wei Qing from the Former Han Dynasty before him, was effective at expelling the Xiongnu from the Tarim Basin, and brought the various people of the Western Regions under Chinese rule during the second half of the 1st century CE, helping to open and secure the trade routes to the west. He was generally outnumbered, but skillfully played on the divisions among his opponents. The kingdoms of Khotan and Kashgar came under Chinese rule by 74 CE.  "Pan Ch'ao crushed fresh rebellions in Kashgar (80, 87) and Yarkand (88), and made the Wusun of the Ili his allies."

Ban Chao was recalled to Luoyang, but then sent again to the Western Region area four years later, during the reign of the new emperor Han Zhang Di. He obtained the military help of the Kushan Empire in 84 in repelling the Kangju who were trying to support the rebellion of the king of Kashgar, and the next year in his attack on Turpan, in the eastern Tarim Basin. Ban Chao ultimately brought the whole of the Tarim Basin under Chinese control.

In recognition for their support to the Chinese, the Kushans (referred to as Da Yuezhi in Chinese sources) requested, but were denied, a Han princess, even though they had sent presents to the Chinese court. In retaliation, they marched on Ban Chao in 90 CE with a force of 70,000 but were defeated by the smaller Chinese force. The Yuezhi retreated and paid tribute to the Chinese Empire. (Later, during the Yuanchu period, 114–120 CE, the Kushans sent a military force to install Chenpan, who had been a hostage among them, as king of Kashgar).

In 91 CE, Ban Chao finally succeeded in pacifying the Western Regions and was awarded the title of Protector General and stationed at Qiuci (Kucha). A Wuji Colonel was re-established and, commanding five hundred soldiers, stationed in the Kingdom of Nearer Jushi, within the walls of Gaochang, 29 kilometres southeast of Turfan. In 94 CE, Chao proceeded to again attack and defeat Yanqi [Karashahr]. Subsequently, more than fifty kingdoms presented hostages, as submission to the Han Dynasty.
 
In 97 CE Ban Chao sent an envoy, Gan Ying, who reached the Persian Gulf or the Black Sea and left the first recorded Chinese account of Europe. Some modern authors have claimed that Ban Chao advanced to the Caspian Sea, however, this interpretation has been criticized as a misreading.

In 102 CE Ban Chao was retired as Protector General of the Western Regions due to age and ill health, and returned to the capital Luoyang at the age of 70, but the following month died there in the 9th month of the 14th Yongyuan year (30 Sept. to 28 Oct. 102). See: Hou Hanshu, chap 77 (sometimes given as chap. 107). Following his death, the power of the Xiongnu in the Western Territories increased again, and subsequent Chinese emperors did not reach so far to the west again until the Tang Dynasty.

A family of historians 
Ban Chao also belonged to a family of historians.  His father was Ban Biao (3–54 CE) who started the History of the Western Han Dynasty (Hanshu; The Book of Han) in 36, which was completed by his son Ban Gu (32–92) and his daughter Ban Zhao (Ban Chao's brother and sister).  Ban Chao was probably the key source for the cultural and socio-economic data on the Western Regions contained in the Hanshu.

Ban Chao's youngest son Ban Yong (班勇 Bān Yŏng) participated in military campaigns with his father and continued to have a central military role in the Tarim Basin into the 120s.

Ban Chao's family 
 Ban Biao (班彪; 3–54; father)
 Ban Gu (班固; 32–92; first son)
 Ban Chao (班超; 32–102; second son)
 Ban Xiong (班雄; ?–after 107; Ban Chao's eldest son)
 Ban Shi (班始; ?–130; Ban Xiong's son)
 Ban Yong (班勇; ?–after 127; Ban Chao's youngest son)
 Ban Zhao (班昭; 45–116; Ban Chao's sister) She's the one who petitioned the reigning Emperor to let his brother return home from his posting.

Famous quotes
(Chengyu)
 "Throw away your writing brush and join the military!" – based on his words "A brave man has no other plan but to follow Fu Jiezi and Zhang Qian's footsteps and do something and become somebody in a foreign land.  How can I waste my life on writing? (大丈夫無他志略，猶當效傅介子、張騫立功異域，以取封侯，安能久事筆硯間乎？) in Book of the Later Han. 
 "...he who does not enter the tiger's lair will never catch its cubs." (不入虎穴，不得虎子) – similar to the saying "Nothing ventured, nothing gained."
 "To die without glory is not the act of valiant men."

See also
 Han-Xiongnu War
 Battle of Yiwulu
 Guo Xun
 Zhang Qian
 Ban Yong

References

Citations

Sources 

 Chavannes, Édouard (1906). "Trois Généraux Chinois de la dynastie des Han Orientaux. Pan Tch’ao (32–102 p.C.); – son fils Pan Yong; – Leang K’in (112 p.C.). Chapitre LXXVII du Heou Han chou." T’oung pao 7, pp. 210–269.
  
 The Tarim Mummies. J.P. Mallory and Victor H. Mair (2000). Thames & Hudson.

Further reading 
 Yap, Joseph P. (2019). The Western Regions, Xiongnu and Han, from the Shiji, Hanshu and Hou Hanshu. 

32 births
102 deaths
1st-century Chinese people
1st-century diplomats
Chinese explorers
Explorers of Central Asia
Legendary Chinese people
Han dynasty diplomats
Han dynasty generals from Shaanxi
Han dynasty politicians from Shaanxi
Politicians from Xianyang